Paul Genesse (born 1973) is a writer of young adult fantasy novels and a cardiac unit nurse at Intermountain Medical Center in Murray, Utah. His first book, The Golden Cord, was a best seller for Five Star Publishing.

Biography
Genesse graduated from Beatty High School in 1992 in Beatty, Nevada. While attending high school, Genesse decided he wanted to become a nurse. He graduated in 1996 with a Bachelor's degree in nursing from Northern Arizona University in Flagstaff, Arizona, where he also took multiple writing classes.

His writing has been influenced by television series such as M*A*S*H and China Beach, as well as The Lord of the Rings series by J. R. R. Tolkien.

He currently lives in South Jordan, Utah.

Works

Iron Dragon series
Genesse has published two volumes of his Iron Dragon series through Five Star Publishing, the science fiction and fantasy imprint of the publishing house Gale. The third book in the series was published through Iron Dragon Books. The first volume was a best seller for the publisher, and was reprinted multiple times. There are five books in the series.

 The Golden Cord (April 16, 2008, Five Star)
 The Dragon Hunters (May 15, 2009, Five Star)
 The Secret Empire (January 14, 2012, Iron Dragon)
 The Crystal Eye (forthcoming, Iron Dragon)
 The Iron Brotherhood (finale, forthcoming, Iron Dragon)

Short works
He has also published a number of short stories in various anthologies and magazines.
 "The Mob", published in Furry Fantastic (Daw Books, 2006)
 "The Pirate Witch" in Pirates of the Blue Kingdoms (Walkabout Publishing, 2007)
 "Almost Brothers" in Fellowship Fantastic (Daw Books, 2008)
 "God Pays" in The Dimension Next Door (Daw Books, 2008)
 "Greg and Eli" in Imaginary Friends (Daw Books, 2008)
 "The Queen's Ransom" in Blue Kingdoms: Shades and Specters (Walkabout, 2008)
 "Captain Maeve" in Blue Kingdoms: Buxom Buccaneers (Walkabout, 2009)
 "Kitty and the City" in Catopolis (Daw Books, 2009)
 "Revenge of the Little Match Girl" in Terribly Twisted Tales (Daw Books, 2009)
 "The Nubian Queen" in Steampunk'd (Daw Books, 2010)
 "The Cost of a Tasmanian Tiger" in The Chain Story created by Mike Stackpole

As editor
 The Crimson Pact, Volume 1 (Alliteration Ink, 2011)
 The Crimson Pact, Volume 2 (Alliteration Ink, 2011)
 The Crimson Pact, Volume 3 (Alliteration Ink, 2012)
 The Crimson Pact, Volume 4'' (Alliteration Ink, 2012)

References

External links

21st-century American novelists
American fantasy writers
American male novelists
American nurses
Northern Arizona University alumni
American writers of young adult literature
Writers from Nevada
Novelists from Utah
Male nurses
American male short story writers
People from Nye County, Nevada
1973 births
Living people
21st-century American short story writers
21st-century American male writers